Towle Point is a point 1 nautical mile (1.9 km) north of Post Office Hill that marks the northeast extremity of Ross Island. In association with the names of expeditionary ships grouped on this island, named after USNS Private John R. Towle, a ship that carried cargo to this area in support of United States Antarctic Program (USAP) in at least 18 seasons, 1956–80.

Headlands of Ross Island